Tuğberk Gedikli (born October 13, 1991) is a Turkish professional basketball player for Afyon Belediye of the Basketbol Süper Ligi, who plays as a point guard.

External links
Tuğberk Gedikli TBLStat.net Profile
Tuğberk Gedikli Eurobasket Profile
Tuğberk Gedikli Twitter

1991 births
Living people
Afyonkarahisar Belediyespor players
Bursaspor Basketbol players
Darüşşafaka Basketbol players
Point guards
Sportspeople from Bursa
Tofaş S.K. players
Turkish men's basketball players
Uşak Sportif players
21st-century Turkish people